Nischaldas (1791-1860 or 1792–1863) was a Hindu saint and writer. He wrote many books on Vedic themes, the most popular of which is Vichara Sagar, an important work on the advaita philosophy.

Life

Nischaldas was born in Dhanana village of present-day Haryana, in 1791 or 1792. His family belonged to the Dahiya gotra of Jats.

After a few years, he moved from Punjab to Delhi, where he met his Guru Amaradas. He stayed with him for 14 years learning various aspects of Hindu philosophy. Then he moved to Kashi to learn advaita. He then undertook a tour of India, teaching various aspects of philosophy. He finally settled down in Delhi and passed away in 1863.

Works
Vriti Prabhakar
Vichara Sagar
Yukti Prakash
Tatva Siddhant

References

Indian Hindu saints
Advaita Vedanta
Advaitin philosophers
1790s births
1860s deaths